Hasir (also spelled Hosir) is a census town in the Gomia CD block in the Bermo subdivision of the Bokaro district in the Indian state of Jharkhand.

Geography

Location                             

Area overview
Bokaro district consists of undulating uplands on the Chota Nagpur Plateau with the Damodar River cutting a valley right across. The East Bokaro Coalfield located in the Bermo-Phusro area and small intrusions of Jharia Coalfield make Bokaro a coal rich district. In 1965, one of the largest steel manufacturing units in the country, Bokaro Steel Plant, operated by Steel Authority of India Limited, was set-up at Bokaro Steel City. The Damodar Valley Corporation established its first thermal power station at Bokaro (Thermal). The soil is generally infertile and agriculture is mostly rain-fed.

Note: The map alongside presents some of the notable locations in the district. All places marked in the map are linked in the larger full screen map.

Demographics
According to the 2011 Census of India, Hasir had a total population of 11,195, of which 5,772 (52%) were males and 5,428 (48%) were females. Population in the age range 0–6 years was 1,504. The total number of literate persons in Hasir was 7,081 (73.07% of the population over 6 years).

Infrastructure
According to the District Census Handbook 2011, Bokaro, Hasir  covered an area of 8.42 km2. Among the civic amenities, it had 20 km roads with open drains, the protected water supply involved hand pump, uncovered wells. It had 1,990 domestic electric connections. Among the medical facilities, it had 1 hospital, 5 dispensaries, 5 health centres, 1 family welfare centre, 1 maternity and child welfare centre, 1 maternity home, 65 nursing homes, no  medicine shop. Among the educational facilities it had 1 primary school, 1 middle school, 1 secondary school, the nearest senior secondary school at Bokaro 60 km away.

References

Cities and towns in Bokaro district